1. April 2000 is a 1952 political satire film directed by Wolfgang Liebeneiner and starring Hilde Krahl, made during the Allied Occupation of Austria (1945–55). The script was reportedly commissioned at the request of the Austrian government, and is a political satire depicting a harmless, potentially congenial future Austria still subject to needless and stifling oversight by the four Allied powers, as established following the defeat of Nazi Germany in World War II (as it was when the film was made). The film was entered into the 1953 Cannes Film Festival.

Plot summary
After numerous fruitless negotiations with the Allies about the independence of Austria, the Austrian prime minister prompts his fellow countrymen to shred their four-language identity cards, which have been issued by the Allies, thus sending a clear signal to the world. Thereupon, Austria is charged for breaking the "world peace" at the fictitious "world court". The implicated message is clear: in the same manner as Austria was, in Austria's eyes, falsely indicted for breaking the world peace (1914 and 1939), they are now being indicted again in 2000.

The world court hovers in with its space rocket into Vienna and lands in front of Schönbrunn Palace. The Austrians now have to prove that they are a lovely nation, and that they would never break the world peace. Subsequently, everything which is supposed to make Austria lovely is presented, starting with Mozart, going over Prince Eugene of Savoy, Empress Maria Theresa of Austria, Viennese wine, the Viennese waltz, the mountains, the classic bands, etc. Despite the presented evidence, Austria will be found guilty. Just before the conviction is made, the Moscow Declaration of 1943 is discovered. The declaration clearly states that Austria is to be freed, which happens at the end of the film. Back in the current time of 1952, and in reality, it is bemoaned that those actions and the independence of Austria will not take place until the year 2000.

Cast

References 

 Wingrove, David. Science Fiction Film Source Book (Longman Group Limited, 1985)

External links
 

1952 films
1950s science fiction films
Films set in the future
Austrian political satire films
1950s German-language films
Films directed by Wolfgang Liebeneiner
Films set in 2000
Austrian science fiction films
Austrian black-and-white films